Roger Menghi (born 13 August 1935) is a Luxembourgian fencer. He competed in the individual épée event at the 1976 Summer Olympics.

References

External links
 

1935 births
Living people
People from Differdange
Luxembourgian male épée fencers
Olympic fencers of Luxembourg
Fencers at the 1976 Summer Olympics